This was a new event on the 2013 ITF Women's Circuit.

Ekaterina Bychkova and Nadiya Kichenok won the title, defeating Başak Eraydın and Aleksandrina Naydenova in the final, 3–6, 6–2, [10–5].

Seeds

Draw

References 
 Draw

Lale Cup - Doubles
Lale Cup